Kaal Bhairav Mandir may refer to any temple dedicated to the Hindu deity Kaal Bhairav, including:

 Kaal Bhairav Mandir, Varanasi, India
 Kal Bhairav temple, Ujjain, India
 Kal Bhairab Temple, Brahmanbaria, Bangladesh

See also 
 List of Bhairava temples
 Kaal Bhairav Rahasya